Elizabeth Salisbury Dennis  (born 10 December 1943) is an Australian scientist working mainly in the area of plant molecular biology. She is currently a chief scientist at the plant division of CSIRO Canberra. She was elected a Fellow of the Australian Academy of Technological Sciences and Engineering (FTSE) in 1987, and the Australian Academy of Science in 1995. She jointly received the inaugural Prime Minister's Science Prize together with Professor Jim Peacock in 2000 for her outstanding achievements in science and technology.

Personal background

Early years and education
Elizabeth Salisbury Dennis, known as Liz Dennis, was born in Sydney, New South Wales, Australia, on 10 December 1943. In her school years, she was inspired by the life of Marie Curie and decided to become a scientist. She completed a Bachelor of Science in chemistry and biochemistry at the University of Sydney (1964), and focused on DNA replication in bacteria during her Ph.D entitled "Studies on the Bacillus subtilis genome" (awarded in 1968).

Career posts
Dennis went on to study the replication of the yeast mitochondrial DNA during her post-doctoral years in the laboratory of Dr Julius Marmur in New-York (1968–1970).

She then spent four years in Papua New Guinea where she became a lecturer in Microbiology and Biochemistry (1970–1972) and Senior Lecturer in Biochemistry (1974–1976). At this time, she was studying chromosomes and DNA of native rodents, and wrote a guide on the rodents of Papua New Guinea together with Jim Menzies, the zoologist she worked with.
In 1972, she was appointed as a Research Scientist at the CSIRO Division of Plant Industry in Canberra, promoted to the grade of Chief Research Scientist in 1991 and subsequently became CSIRO Fellow in 2001.

Meanwhile, she had the chance to visit the Biochemistry Department of Stanford University thanks to a Fulbright Fellowship and worked in the laboratory of the Nobel Prize winner Paul Berg (1982–83). She also visited Australian National University in 1991 and became Adjunct Professor there between 1992 and 1998.

Research
With a strong interest in plant gene expression and regulation, Prof Elizabeth Dennis studied plant development using molecular approaches and was involved in mapping plant genomes.

Plant response to hypoxia
Her early work in the plant field was dedicated to the molecular responses of plants to hypoxia and waterlogging, i.e. which genes are switched on by low oxygen levels. She, together with her collaborators, cloned the gene encoding the enzyme alcohol dehydrogenase and identified the regulatory motifs controlling its expression in response to the lack of oxygen. She also was involved in the research showing that all plants contain haemoglobin and that this molecule protects the plant against oxygen deprivation stress

Plant flowering
Understanding how flowering is regulated in plants is another research area she successfully tackled. Her team worked on genes that represses flowering (FLC and FLF, FLOWERING LOCUS C and FLOWERING LOCUS F) and showed that their effect is down-regulated by vernalisation. They also observed that a reduction in DNA methylation plays an important role in this response to cold. The mechanism involves histone de-acetylation at FLC and methylation of FLC in vernalised plants, both reactions performed by a single protein complex.

Molecular bases of heterosis
Her more recent work is dedicated to understanding the phenomenon of heterosis or hybrid vigour, i.e. the increased biomass of hybrids as compared with their parents. Factors involved in this regulation are small RNA molecules (sRNA), DNA methylation and histone modification.

Honours 
a Senior Scholar Fulbright Fellowship, 1982
Fellow of Australian Academy of Technological Sciences and Engineering, 1987
Pharmacia LKB/Biotechnology Medal of the Australian Biochemical Society, 1988
Fellow of Australian Academy of Science, 1995
Avon Spirit of Achievement Award, 1997
Lemberg Medal of the Australian Society of Biochemistry and Molecular Biology, 1998
Prime Minister's Science Prize, 2000
Fellow of the American Society for the Advancement of Science, 2002
Farrer Memorial Trust Medal, 2014
Companion of the Order of Australia, 2019
 Member of National Academy of Sciences, 2021
Ruby Payne-Scott Medal and Lecture awarded by the Australian Academy of Science, 2022

Past 
 Chairman of the Multinational Arabidopsis Genome Project
 President of the Australian Society of Biochemistry and Molecular Biology (1992–94)
 Director of the International Society of Plant Molecular Biology from 1990–93

References

External links 
Dr Liz Dennis: researching plant genomics | CSIRO

1943 births
Living people
Scientists from Sydney
Australian women scientists
Women molecular biologists
Fellows of the Australian Academy of Science
University of Sydney alumni
Academic staff of the Australian National University
Farrer Medal recipients
Fellows of the Australian Academy of Technological Sciences and Engineering
Companions of the Order of Australia
Foreign associates of the National Academy of Sciences